La Coupole d’Alger Arena is an indoor sporting arena located in Dely Ibrahim, Algeria. The capacity of the arena is 5,500 spectators. It hosts indoor sporting events such as Handball, Basketball, Volleyball. It also hosted many international competitions and many political gatherings and concerts. The Arena was inaugurated on the occasion of the hosting of the 1975 Mediterranean Games. there are six entrances in the Arena, one of which is for the official, the Arena is of one floor in a circular way, there is also a small second floor for VIP.

Competitions hosted
Some of major senior competitions are below
Pan Arab Games
1 time (2004)
Mediterranean Games
1 time (1975)
All-Africa Games
2 times (1978 & 2007)
African Handball Championship
4 times (Men's & Women's 1976, Men's & Women's 1989, Men's & Women's 2000 & Men's & Women's 2014)
FIBA Africa Championship
2 times (Men's 1995 & Men's 2005)
African Volleyball Championship
1 time (Men's 1993)
African Wrestling Championships
1 time (2020)
Men's Junior World Handball Championship
1 time (Men's U21 2017)
Vocotruyen World Championships
1 time 2022 Vocotruyen World Championship

See also
 July 5, 1962 Stadium

External links
 agguerabi.com

References

Indoor arenas in Algeria
Sports venues in Algiers
Volleyball venues in Algeria
Basketball venues in Algeria
Handball venues in Algeria